The 1998–99 season was the 97th season in which Dundee competed at a Scottish national level, playing in the top tier of Scottish football, the Scottish Premier League, for the first time since the 1993–94 season after winning the First Division the previous season. Dundee would finish the league season in 5th place with 46 points, their highest finish in Scottish football since 1973–74. Dundee would also compete in the Scottish League Cup and the Scottish Cup, where they were knocked out by Alloa Athletic in the 2nd round of the League Cup, and by Greenock Morton in the 3rd round of the Scottish Cup.

Scottish Premier League

Legend

Dundee's score comes first. Statistics provided by Dee Archive

Final league table

Scottish Cup 

Statistics provided by Dee Archive

Scottish League Cup 
Statistics provided by Dee Archive

Player statistics 
Statistics provided by Dee Archive

|}

See also 

 List of Dundee F.C. seasons

References

External links
 Dundee 1998–99 at Soccerbase.com (select relevant season from dropdown list)

Dundee F.C. seasons
Dundee